Valiollah Momeni (May 31, 1944 — December 29, 2015) was an Iranian actor and voice actor. Momeni had played in famous movies and TV series including Foggy Tabriz and Mokhtarnameh.

References

External links 
 
 Valiollah Momeni in Internet database of Soureh Cinema

1944 births
2015 deaths

Iranian male actors
Iranian male television actors
Iranian male actors by century
People from Ardabil